Francisco de Asís Alarcón Estaba (born January 4, 1950, in Caracas, Venezuela) is a Venezuelan writer, poet and editor.
Popularly known as Francisco Alarcón, poet and writer whose years of reading, the beginning in romantic literature, transform him into Rolando or Rodrigo Díaz de Vivar, and take him to William Shakespeare, in his opinion, the great interpreter of nature human On that tour, he gives us Chronicles of Caracas, Tales of Gallero, poetry and essays. The intimate world in poems. The poet and writer assumes his commitment as a public intellectual, when faced with the need to understand, to see clearly, he catches the phenomena of the environment and his inner world, and then communicates what is seen and experienced. It is one of the prominent voices of the 80s generation in Venezuela and Latin America. Founder and editor of the Venezuelan digital newspaper, PUBLICACIONES FRANCISCO ALARCÖN in  Caracas  dated 2000.

At age of 21, Alarcon completed his academic studies, earning a Doctorate in Economics and Social Sciences.
In his Biographical essays Francisco Alarcón see us being work by famous poets and writers. Without a premeditated order their biographies take us to The Generation of the 98, The Generation of 27, and The "Modernism", and continues among others with Jules Verne, Victor Hugo, Charles Baudelaire, Walt Whitman, Mark Twain There is no order precipitated with the grace and depth emerging authors, in his poetry begins with rhymed verses and sonnets with sadness and humor. Then, free verse, and deviations from the Castilian meters, looking abyss, fears and ghosts, Exchange is intended for itself.

Currently, Alarcon devotes himself to intellectual activity, being a regular columnist for printed media, such as:  El Nacional, Últimas Noticias, 2001, El Globo, Tal Cual y Abril and electronic media such as Analitica,  NoticieroDigital,  La Historia Paralela (Argentina) and Diario de América (EEUU)

His poems, short stories and essays have been translated into several languages and published in different Latin American media, including Brazil, Argentina, Peru, México, Cuba as well as, in EUA, Europe and Australia.

His poetry work is part of  "Como Ángeles en llamas. Algunas voces latinoamericanas del Siglo XX".

Américo Martín has described his style as " centauric " or " integralistic'.

Francisco Alarcón has more than fifty published books.

Works 

 Poemas número uno (1968) 
 Cuentos del gallero (1969) 
 Segundos aires  (2003)
 Sueños de agua (2003) .
 Ven, niña  (2004)  
 Resplandores hueros I y II (2004)  
 Alucinación (2005)
 Encuentro  (2005)  
 Cuéntese, camarada (2006) 
 Ensayos (2005) 
 Chavéz no es un problema teórico (2007)  
 Obras escogidas  (2007)
 Mujer  (2008)
 Da la cara (2008)
 Prosas fúnebres  (2008)  
 La historia de lo ajeno 978-980-12-2774-8 (2009)  
 Venezuela es tuya y mía también. (2009) 
 A...  (2010)  
 Soledad y otros poemas (2011) 
 Sutilezas Tomo I y II (2012)

References

External links 
"EcuRed"
"Quiénes escriben en Venezuela. Diccionario abreviado de escritores venezolanos (siglos XVIII a XXI) / Rafael Ángel Rivas Dugarte; Gladys García Riera"
 "Red mundial de escritores en español"
"Homenaje a Francisco Alarcón: Soledad y otros poemas"
– "Othlo / Letras / Poesía "
"El Librero.com"
  "Letralia (tierra de las letras)presentación Mujer "
 "La enciclopedia"
 "Biblioteca virtual Miguel de Cervantes"
 "Página de poesía Antonio Miranda (Brasil)"
 "Francisco Alarcón en la poesía (Américo Martín)"
 "Biblioteca del soneto (Alarcón,Francisco)"

1950 births
20th-century Venezuelan poets
Living people
21st-century Venezuelan poets
Venezuelan male poets
Venezuelan columnists
20th-century male writers
21st-century male writers